Gibraltar Rock State Natural Area is a natural area in southern Wisconsin, United States, which is  in size, and is located along the  Ice Age Trail.

Location
The  Wisconsin River Valley and Lake Wisconsin are located within view of the higher-elevation points in the natural area. The Gibraltar Rock State Natural Area is located along the Ice Age Trail, which is a thousand miles long. Wisconsin County Road V runs past the area, with a parking lot located off the road that allows access to it. From there, a walking trail leads off to gain access to Gibraltar Rock.

History

Early on, the Van Ness family owned the land and had a house on the property. Other early families living in the area includes the Richmond family. During the 1920s, Wisconsin landscape architect Jens Jensen started efforts to protect the area. Forming a group at the University of Wisconsin–Madison in 1920, the group was able to acquire the land in 1927. They named the area Richmond Park. The Gibraltar Rock State Natural Area became a Wisconsin-designated natural area in 1969. It was originally owned by the county until 2007, when they transferred ownership to the Wisconsin Department of Natural Resources (WDNR). A celebration was held following the transfer of ownership.

Background
The Wisconsin Department of Natural Resources manages the Gibraltar Rock State Natural Area. Howard Van Ness made several paintings depicting the area prior to its designation as a state natural area. Friends of Gibraltar Rock exists and does "biological indexing of the flora and fauna in the area." The views from the natural area are a major tourist draw. The  track for the area does not have wheelchair access. People are not allowed to climb the rocks in the park, though this has not always been the case.

Geology
The natural area is located on the outer part of the Magnesian Escarpment/Black River Escarpment, with the soil for the area being glaciated sandy loams, which sit on top of the Galena-Platteville dolomite cap and St. Peter sandstone. Inside the natural area is a  flat-topped butte called "Gibraltar Rock." There is a  trail leading up to the Rock.

Wildlife and fauna
Cliff goldenrod, columbine, ferns, pale corydalis and red cedar, little blue-stem, side oats grama, prairie drop-seed, blue-eyed grass, bird's foot violet, bergamot, pasque flower, leadplant, aster, whorled milkweed, and prairie smoke are located within the natural area.

References

State Natural Areas of Wisconsin
Protected areas of Columbia County, Wisconsin
Rock formations of Wisconsin
Landforms of Columbia County, Wisconsin
Protected areas established in 1969
1969 establishments in Wisconsin